A Capela is a municipality in province of A Coruña in the autonomous community of Galicia in north-western Spain. It is located in the comarca of Eume. It has a population of 1,238 inhabitants (INE, 2018) and a population density of 24.81 inhabitants per square kilometer.

References

See also
Fragas do Eume

Capela, A